Hať (formerly Haš) is a municipality and village in Opava District in the Moravian-Silesian Region of the Czech Republic. It has about 2,500 inhabitants. It is part of the historic Hlučín Region.

Notable people
Paul Billik (1891–1926), German fighter pilot

References

External links

 

Villages in Opava District
Hlučín Region